Kalamandalam Radhika is an Indian classical dancer, choreographer, research scholar, teacher, writer and philanthropist. She was the first non-resident Keralite to win the Kerala Sangeetha Nataka Akademi Award for Mohiniyattom. She learnt Kuchipudi, Bharatanatyam, Kathakali and other dance forms.

Early years and education
Kalamandalam Radhika was born in Bangalore to K.K Nair, a chartered accountant. She started learning dancing at the age of three under Guru Rajan, and later learnt Kathakali from Muttar Sri. Narayana Panicker and mridhangamvaitharis from Guru Ponniahpillai.
In the late 1960s, she moved to Cheruthuruthy and stayed at the Kalamandalam for four years. Under the wings of Chinnammu Amma, Kalamandalam Sathyabhama and Kalamandalam Padmanabhan Nair she was moulded into a skilled performer. Her tutelage under the late Kalamandalam Kalyani Kutty Amma and  her training under Kalamandalam Padmanabha Ashan in Kathakali honed her skills.

Dancer and choreographer
She has conducted more than two thousand performances in India and abroad at national and international levels. She is a member of the UNESCO International Dance Council, and has conducted her performances for  WHO delegates, SAARC delegates, diplomats, Soviet representatives, and others.
To explore the depths of Mohiniyattom, she has undertaken extensive research, and re-organized the basic steps, jewellery and costumes worn by Mohiniyattom dancers of the early 1940s. She has executed and choreographed biblical themes including the advent of Christianity in India, and  the birth of Christ.

Radhika has conducted workshops in US, UK, Europe, Atlanta, and Germany. She has also choreographed and danced for Behold Thy Mother, a biblical film directed by an Italian priest Fr.Gerard. She has composed and choreographed five cholkettus, three varnams and innumerable padams in different languages. She was criticized for performing biblical themes in Mohiniattam, but the poetical works of VeerappaMoily, Kuvempu, Fr. Abel, Amruth Someshwar and St. Chavara as adapted by Radhika were well received.

Author
Radhika has written numerous articles for the dance and music magazine Shrutilaya and has submitted a paper on Mohiniyattom at a seminar organized by the NCERT on the subject of ‘Dance Education in Schools'.
She has also written an article about the Devadasi system of Kerala for the weekly Indu , published from Houston, USA, and is the author of the books 'Mohiniyattom-The Lyrical Dance of Kerala´ and ‘Mudra’ published by Mathrabhoomi.

Appearances
Television

Film

Endorsement
 Oxygen - The Digital Shop Advertisement
 Pankajakasturi

See also

 Kalamandalam Padmanabhan Nair
 Kalamandalam Kalyanikutty Amma
 Kalamandalam Satyabhama
 Mohiniyattam

References

Living people
21st-century Indian actresses
Indian female classical dancers
Performers of Indian classical dance
Indian women choreographers
Indian choreographers
Indian women philanthropists
Indian philanthropists
Actresses from Bangalore
Dancers from Karnataka
Year of birth missing (living people)
Actresses in Malayalam television
Actresses in Malayalam cinema
Actresses in Tamil cinema
Indian television actresses
Indian film actresses
Mohiniyattam exponents
Recipients of the Kerala Sangeetha Nataka Akademi Award